Lestes dichrostigma is a species of spreadwing in the damselfly family Lestidae. It is found in South America.

The IUCN conservation status of Lestes dichrostigma is "LC", least concern, with no immediate threat to the species' survival. The IUCN status was reviewed in 2009.

References

Further reading

 

Lestes
Articles created by Qbugbot
Insects described in 1909